Al-Qastal ("Kastel") was a Palestinian village located eight kilometers west of Jerusalem and named for a Crusader castle located on the hilltop. Used in 1948 during the Arab-Israeli War as a military base by the Army of the Holy War, virtually all of its residents fled during the fighting and the village was eventually captured by the Palmach.

History

Crusader period
A Crusader castle called Belveer or Beauverium (in Latin Videbelum) was built there around 1168 CE. It is listed among the castles destroyed by Sultan al-Adil I in 1191–92 CE. No trace remains today of the castle.

Belveer is mentioned in a letter from Eraclius, Latin Patriarch of Jerusalem, written in the aftermath of the catastrophic Crusader defeat at the Battle of Hattin and dated September 1187, in which he describes the capture by the Muslims of a long list of towns of the Kingdom of Jerusalem, and the slaughter of Christians "by the sword of Mafumetus the Unbeliever and his evil worshipper Saladin".

Ottoman period
In 1838 el-Kustul was noted as a Muslim village, part of Beni Malik area, located west of Jerusalem.

In 1863, Victor Guérin found modern buildings on ancient ruins. He noted that the village belonged to the Abu Ghosh clan.
An Ottoman village list from about 1870 found that Kastal had a population of 10, in 5 houses; the population count included only men.

In 1883, in the PEF's Survey of Western Palestine, al-Qastal was described as "a small stone village in a conspicuous position on a rocky hill-top" with springs to the east.

In 1896 the population of El-kastal was estimated to be about 39 persons.

British Mandate period
In the 1922 census of Palestine conducted by the British Mandate authorities, Qastal had a population 43, all Muslims,
increasing in the 1931 census to 59; 55 Muslims and 4 Christians, in a total of 14 houses.

In the 1945 statistics, the village, with a population of 90 Muslims, had a total of 42 dunums of land allocated to cereals. 169 dunums were irrigated or used for orchards, including 50 dunams of olive trees.

1948 war
In 1948, al-Qastal was a key position on the Jaffa-Jerusalem road and was used by Arab forces to attack Jewish relief convoys so as to prevent them from reaching the besieged Jewish parts of Jerusalem. For this purpose, it was occupied by the Army of the Holy War led by Abd al-Qadir al-Husayni, the commander of the Jerusalem Hills sector.

The village was assaulted by the Palmach's Harel Brigade and two squads of the Haganah during Operation Nachshon, after a previous minor clash had already caused most civilian inhabitants to flee. Palmach troops occupied the village on April 3, but its commander was refused permission to blow up the houses.

Forces under Abd al-Qadir al-Husayni attacked and besieged the Haganah-held village on 7 April 1948. During the following, foggy night Al-Husayni himself was killed by a Haganah sentinel in a bizarre incident. On April 8, armed Arabs from the entire area, motivated by the disappearance of their leader, attacked and recaptured al-Qastal. However, Al-Husayni's death is said to have led to a loss of morale among his forces.
Most fighters left their positions to attend al-Husayni's funeral at the Masjid Al-Aqsa on Friday, April 9. Palmach troops retook the almost fully deserted village on the night of April 8-9th; they blew up most of the houses and made the hill a command post, which they managed to hold on to.

Israel
Parts of the Israeli town of Mevaseret Zion are located on the former lands of Al-Qastal.

The remains of the village at the hilltop has been fitted out by the Israel Nature and Parks Authority as Castel National Site, "a symbol of the struggle to break through to Jerusalem during the War of Independence", where one can visit the 1948 trenches and a monument to the fallen, see a movie, and descend along a scenic trail.

Gallery

See also
 Castel National Park
 Depopulated Palestinian locations in Israel
 List of villages depopulated during the Arab–Israeli conflict

References

Bibliography

Volume 2
Volume 3

Copy at the National Library of Israel (from microfilm)
Reproduced in

External links
 Welcome To al-Qastal
 al-Qastal, Zochrot
 Survey of Western Palestine, Map 17: IAA, Wikimedia commons
 Al-Qastal from the Khalil Sakakini Cultural Center
 Al-Qastal, Palestine-Family.net

Arab villages depopulated during the 1948 Arab–Israeli War
Castles and fortifications of the Kingdom of Jerusalem
Jerusalem District